"All I Wanna Do" is a song performed by American singer and songwriter Sheryl Crow. The song was written by Crow, David Baerwald, Bill Bottrell, and Kevin Gilbert, with lyrics adapted from Wyn Cooper's 1987 poem "Fun". It was Crow's breakthrough hit from her 1993 debut album, Tuesday Night Music Club. The song is Crow's biggest US hit, peaking at number two on the Billboard Hot 100 for six consecutive weeks from October 8 to November 12, 1994, and it also topped the Billboard Adult Contemporary chart. It was the winner of the 1995 Grammy for Record of the Year and Best Female Pop Vocal Performance and was nominated for Song of the Year.

In addition to its US success, "All I Wanna Do" peaked at number one in Australia for one week and in Canada for four weeks, also topping the RPM Adult Contemporary chart in the latter country. In New Zealand and the United Kingdom, it peaked at number four, and in Europe, it reached the top 10 in Austria, Flemish Belgium, France, Germany, Ireland and the Netherlands. It is Crow's biggest international hit to date.

Crow performed the song on her live album Sheryl Crow and Friends: Live from Central Park.

Background and structure
The lyrics of the song are based on the poem "Fun" by Wyn Cooper. Cooper was inspired to write the poem by a conversation at a bar with a friend and occasional writer, Bill Ripley, in which he said "All I want is to have a little fun before I die", which became the first line of the poem. In a 1994 interview, Cooper said: "The poem isn't really about him. Or me. They're different people. They're people you can sort of see as ... well ... objective correlatives. Symbols of people like us, or what we could have been, or what we would have become if we continued to drink and do nothing with our lives." 

Toad Hall Studio, where the song was recorded, was next door to the Pasadena Playhouse. Crow's producer (Bottrell) discovered Cooper's poetry book The Country of Here Below in a  nearby used bookstore in Pasadena, California. Crow had written a song called "I Still Love You" but was unhappy with its lyrics; she used its melody and adapted the poem for her lyrics to "All I Wanna Do". 

The song earned Cooper considerable royalties and helped to promote his book, originally published in a run of only 500 copies in 1987, into multiple reprints. After the song became popular, Ripley brought an unsuccessful lawsuit against Cooper for some of the song's royalties, which ended their friendship.

The opening spoken line, "This ain't no disco", is a reference to the song "Life During Wartime" by Talking Heads.

In 1997, after attending a performance by Crow at the Rosemont Theatre in Illinois, veteran Chicago Tribune music critic Greg Kot called the song "a rewrite of Stealers Wheel's 'Stuck in the Middle with You'".

Critical reception
Larry Flick from Billboard wrote, "Critical darling is poised for a long-deserved top 40 breakthrough with this breezy hand-clapper. Crow has a friendly demeanor that adds extra bounce to a sweet instrumental setting of jangly guitars and toe-tapping beats. Live-sounding jam is a fitting soundtrack to a day at the beach or speeding down the highway with the top down." Troy J. Augusto from Cash Box felt it should have been the first single from Tuesday Night Music Club. "Devil-may-care lyrics (“I like a good beer-buzz, early in the morning”), a cool country twang and Sheryl’s friendly vocal style should all spell hit for this feelin’-good number. Rock, country, adult and, particularly, hits radio should all find lots to love about this low-key frolic. Don’t miss the live show." In a second single review, he noted, "Seriously infectious hook, simple yet clever instrumentation and Crow’s likable personality all spell a winner here. A perfect summertime track, “All I Wanna Do” could well be the song that kicks off Sheryl’s run at the big leagues." James Masterton commented in his weekly UK chart commentary, that "All I Wanna Do" "certainly has potential to go further, not least with Lisa Loeb as a role model but my one overwhelming confession is that I honestly cannot see what all the fuss is about. It's a good record, but no more." Alan Jones from Music Week said "this cheery pop/rock smash is a wordy, but expertly delivered and invigorating confection with a catchy chorus." He added, "Brits may not smile as much as US rock buyers, but they'll grin enough to get this into the chart."

Music video
The accompanying music video for "All I Wanna Do" was directed by David Hogan and Roman Coppola, with Martin Coppen directing photography. It features Crow and her band performing the song on the street, with notable characters flying through the air. The video was filmed in front of the Roxy Theatre at the corner of Franklin Street and North 1st Street in Clarksville, Tennessee.

Two versions of the music video exist. The original video featured the character "Billy", mentioned in the song, played by actor Gregory Sporleder. A second version of the video was released with the character's appearances edited out. The edited version appears on Crow's "Greatest Hits" music video DVD. In 2009, an additional music video was released, featured on the 2009 re-release of Tuesday Night Music Club.

Track listings

 US cassette single (cat. no. 31458 0702 4)
 "All I Wanna Do" (Remix)
 "Solidify"

 French CD single (cat. no. 580-654-2)
 "All I Wanna Do"
 "What I Can Do for You" – Live at the Borderline

 German CD single (cat. no. 580-655-2)
 "All I Wanna Do"
 "I Shall Believe" –  Live in Nashville
 "What I Can Do for You" –  Live at the Borderline

 UK CD 1 (cat. no. 580-843-2)
 "All I Wanna Do" –  Remix
 "Solidify"
 "I'm Gonna Be A Wheel Someday"

 European CD single (cat. no. 580-844-2)
 "All I Wanna Do"

 UK CD 2 (cat. no. 580-845-2)
 "All I Wanna Do" –  live acoustic for Virgin Radio UK
 "Run Baby Run" –  Live acoustic for Virgin Radio UK
 "Leaving Las Vegas" –  Live acoustic for Virgin Radio UK

Charts

Weekly charts

Year-end charts

Certifications

Release history

Cover versions

Amy Studt version

English singer-songwriter Amy Studt released a cover version of "All I Wanna Do" as her fourth single. Studt was asked personally by Sheryl Crow to record a cover of the song, and Crow provided backing vocals on the track.

Released on January 12, 2004, the single reached a peak of number 21 on the UK Singles Chart and number 25 on the Irish Singles Chart. It was taken from the re-release of her debut album, False Smiles. Following the peaking of "All I Wanna Do", Studt was dropped from her record label Polydor for poor sales.

Track listing
 UK CD single
 "All I Wanna Do"
 "Forget It All"
 "You're the Breeze"
 "All I Wanna Do" (video)

Charts

Other versions
US singer Joanne Farrell released a dance version of the song in 1995. The song reached number 40 on the Billboard Dance Club Play chart; it also reached number 40 on the Official UK Singles Chart.

References

External links
 

Sheryl Crow songs
19 Recordings singles
1993 songs
1994 singles
2004 singles
A&M Records singles
Amy Studt songs
Grammy Award for Best Female Pop Vocal Performance
Grammy Award for Record of the Year
Music videos directed by David Hogan
Music videos directed by Roman Coppola
Number-one singles in Australia
Polydor Records singles
RPM Top Singles number-one singles
Song recordings produced by Bill Bottrell
Songs about alcohol
Songs about Los Angeles
Songs based on poems
Songs with feminist themes
Songs written by David Baerwald
Songs written by Kevin Gilbert (musician)
Songs written by Sheryl Crow